The Slovak national baseball team is the national baseball team of Slovakia. The team competes in the biennial European Baseball Championship. The team is controlled by the Slovak Baseball Federation, which is represented in the Confederation of European Baseball.
Current in IBAF World Rankings is 39th (June 2016).

Roster
Slovakia's roster for the European Baseball Championship Qualifier 2022, the last official competition in which the team took part.

Tournament results
European Baseball Championship B division

Qualification to European Baseball Championship
 2007 : 5th in group 2
 2010 : 3rd in group 1

European Junior Baseball Championship

European Youth Baseball Championship

European Juveniles Baseball Championship

External links
Official site (in Slovak)
Slovakia  at the Confederation of European Baseball
Slovakia  at the International Baseball Federation

References

National baseball teams in Europe
Baseball